Thromberg (sorbian Lubin) is a mountain of Saxony, southeastern Germany. It is situated six kilometres south-east of Bautzen and part of the Upper Lusatian mountains.

Mountains of Saxony
Lusatian Highlands